Hootenanny Hoot is a 1963 folk music musical film directed by Gene Nelson. It stars Peter Breck and Ruta Lee.

Plot

A TV director, having split up with his producer-wife, decides to telecast a traveling hootenanny show.

Cast
Peter Breck as Ted Grover
Ruta Lee as A.G. Bannister 
Joby Baker as Steve Laughlin
Pamela Austin as Billie-Jo Henley
Bobo Lewis as Claudia Hoffer

Musical acts:
The Brothers Four
Johnny Cash
Chris Crosby
George Hamilton IV
Judy Henske
Joe and Eddie
Cathie Taylor
Sheb Wooley
The Gateway Trio

Production
Ruta Lee signed in June 1963. Gene Nelson signed to direct.

The film was shot in nine days. Katzman was so pleased he gave Nelson the job directing Elvis Presley in Kissin' Cousins.

Reception
The Los Angeles Times said the plot "wouldn't stand steady in a light breeze" but the filmmakers had "assembled a lively group of hootenany experts - and that's probably enough to ensure success."

References

External links

1963 films
1963 musical films
Metro-Goldwyn-Mayer films
American musical films
Films directed by Gene Nelson
1960s English-language films
1960s American films